Lylian Castillo (born 1 August 1953) is a Uruguayan former swimmer. She competed in five events at the 1968 Summer Olympics.

References

1953 births
Living people
Uruguayan female swimmers
Olympic swimmers of Uruguay
Swimmers at the 1968 Summer Olympics
Sportspeople from Montevideo
Swimmers at the 1967 Pan American Games
Pan American Games medalists in swimming
Pan American Games bronze medalists for Uruguay
Medalists at the 1967 Pan American Games